Robert W. Griffith (October 17, 1940 – January 25, 2011) was an American historian.

Life
Robert W. Griffith was born in Atlanta, Georgia, and grew up in Evansville, Indiana. He graduated from DePauw University, 1964, and received his M.A. and Ph.D. from the University of Wisconsin, 1967, where he was a Woodrow Wilson Fellow.  He taught at the University of Georgia, and at the University of Massachusetts Amherst. He was Dean of the College of Arts and Humanities at the University of Maryland. He taught history and was chair of the history department at American University.

His work has appeared in the American Historical Review, the Journal of American History, Reviews in American History, and Business History Review.

He signed the "Resolution on United States Government Practices Inimical to the Values of the Historical Profession".

He has served on the board of editors of the Journal of American History. He served as treasurer of the Organization of American Historians until stepping down January 1, 2011 for health reasons.

Griffith died on January 25, 2011, due to complications from Hodgkin's lymphoma.

Awards
 1970 Frederick Jackson Turner Award
 1980 Guggenheim Fellowship
 National Endowment for the Humanities Fellowship
 Harry S. Truman Library Institute Fellowship

Works
 "Un-Tangling the Web of Cold War Studies; or, How One Historian Stopped Worrying and Learned to Love the Internet", Journal of Multi-Media History, Vol. 3, 2000
 "Truman and the Historians", April 1974
  (1st edition 1970)

Editor
 The Specter: Original Essays on McCarthyism and the Cold War (1974)
 
  (2nd edition January, 2001; 3rd edition January 2007)

References

Writers from Atlanta
DePauw University alumni
University of Wisconsin–Madison alumni
University of Georgia faculty
University of Maryland, College Park faculty
American University faculty and staff
University of Massachusetts Amherst faculty
Historians from Indiana
2011 deaths
1940 births
Historians from Georgia (U.S. state)